Aud Ingebjørg Groven Halvorsen (born 2 May 1942) is a former Norwegian speed skater who took part in national and international speed skating competitions and represented Norway and the Norwegian sports club Vågå IL.

She won her first medal in the senior national championship at the 1961 Women's Allround National Championship in Rakkestad.

Personal records

References

External links 
 
 DigitaltMuseum: Pictures of Aud Groven.

Norwegian female speed skaters
People from Oppland
1942 births
Living people
Sportspeople from Innlandet